Tuebrook is a North-East area of Liverpool, England. At the 2001 census the population was 14,490.

Toponymy
The origin of the name may be Tew Brook, a tributary of the Alt. The brook itself is now almost entirely piped or culverted, with the last exposed section at the back of a disused cinema.

Description
Tuebrook includes Newsham Park, the Victorian, Grade I listed building St John's Church, Tuebrook Market and Tuebrook Police Station, which is now closed to the public although still in use by Merseyside Police. It is part of the Parliamentary Constituency of Liverpool West Derby. A unique characteristic of the main shopping street is that all shops are on one side of the street only. This is largely due to extensive demolition during upgrading of the main road.

Tuebrook has two secondary schools nearby: West Derby School located on Mill Bank and St Francis of Assisi in Newsham Park.

Government

The area consistently elects Liberal Party Councillors to Liverpool City Council. At recent elections, the Tuebrook Liberals have enjoyed the largest majorities of any councillors on Liverpool City Council.

The current councillors for the Tuebrook and Stoneycroft Ward (Tuebrook until 2004) are Steve Radford, Billy Lake and Joe Dunne. Radford's personal popularity enabled him to finish second in the 2001 general election for Liverpool West Derby, coming ahead of both Conservative and Liberal Democrat candidates. However, in the 2005 general election, this popularity was not enough to keep him in second place and he slipped back down to third, depriving his Liberal Party of its only second-place showing in the UK.

For representation to the House of Commons, the area is within the Liverpool West Derby Parliamentary constituency.

Transport
There are regular buses (numbers 12, 13, 15, 18, 62, 68 and variants thereof) providing services to the city centre, as well as to Aigburth, Bootle, Croxteth, Huyton and Old Swan and Stockbridge village.

The area is bisected by the A5049 West Derby Road, an east/west arterial route out of Liverpool city centre. Tuebrook also has a railway line which carries freight from Tuebrook sidings near Edge Hill to the Port of Liverpool in the north. The bridge, carrying the Canada Dock Branch over West Derby Road, used to accommodate Tue Brook railway station until 1948.

The Merseytram System (Line 1) was scheduled to run through Tuebrook prior to the abandonment of the project when funding from the British Government was denied.

Tue Brook railway station used to serve the area, however the line was closed from passenger traffic in 1948. The line itself (Canada Dock Branch) is still a busy goods route. It was announced in December 2019 that Liverpool City Council had commissioned a feasibility study to consider reopening the Canada Dock Branch to passenger traffic.

References

External links

 Liverpool Ward Profile: Tuebrook & Stoneycroft
 Liverpool Street Gallery - Liverpool 13

Areas of Liverpool